The 1952 Arrest Convention (full title: International Convention for the unification of certain rules relating to Arrest of Sea-going Ships) is a 1952 multilateral treaty whereby states agree to rules on the arrest of ships.

By the Convention, states agree to the following rule: a state agrees to allow a foreign jurisdiction to arrest a ship of its nationality that is present in the foreign jurisdiction's port. The arrest can be made only after a warrant of arrest is issued in the domestic jurisdiction of the port state. The rules of the Convention apply only if both the state of nationality and the state performing the arrest are state parties to the Convention.

The Convention was concluded and signed on 10 May 1952 in Brussels, Belgium; it entered into force on 24 February 1956. It has been signed by 19 states and is in force in 71 jurisdictions. Spain, an original signatory of the Convention, denounced it in 2011. The depositary of the Convention is the government of Belgium.

(The French title is Convention internationale pour l'unification de certaines règles sur la saisie conservatoire des navires de mer.)

Arrest Convention 1999

In 1999, the International Convention on Arrest of Ships was concluded. The intent of the International Maritime Organization is that the 1999 Convention will come to replace the 1952 Convention, but as of 2014 the 1999 Convention has only 11 state parties. It entered into force on 14 September 2011.

External links
Text (English) (preamble omitted).
Text .
Signatures and ratifications at depositary .

1952 in Belgium
Admiralty law treaties
Treaties concluded in 1952
Treaties entered into force in 1956
Treaties of Switzerland
Treaties of Haiti
Treaties of Costa Rica
Treaties of the Republic of Egypt (1953–1958)
Treaties of the Holy See
Treaties of the Kingdom of Cambodia (1953–1970)
Treaties of the Estado Novo (Portugal)
Treaties of the French Fourth Republic
Treaties of the Republic of Dahomey
Treaties of Cameroon
Treaties of the Comoros
Treaties of the Republic of the Congo
Treaties of Ivory Coast
Treaties of Djibouti
Treaties of Gabon
Treaties of Guinea
Treaties of Burkina Faso
Treaties of Mauritania
Treaties of Niger
Treaties of the Central African Republic
Treaties of Madagascar
Treaties of Senegal
Treaties of Mali
Treaties of Chad
Treaties of Togo
Treaties of the United Kingdom
Treaties of Belgium
Treaties of the Federation of Malaya
Treaties of Fiji
Treaties of Guyana
Treaties of Seychelles
Treaties of Nigeria
Treaties of Algeria
Treaties of Antigua and Barbuda
Treaties of the Bahamas
Treaties of Dominica
Treaties of Grenada
Treaties of Saint Kitts and Nevis
Treaties of Saint Lucia
Treaties of Saint Vincent and the Grenadines
Treaties of Belize
Treaties of Kiribati
Treaties of the Solomon Islands
Treaties of Tuvalu
Treaties of the Kingdom of Greece
Treaties of Yugoslavia
Treaties of Paraguay
Treaties of Syria
Treaties of West Germany
Treaties of the Polish People's Republic
Treaties of Tonga
Treaties of Italy
Treaties of the Netherlands
Treaties of Cuba
Treaties of Denmark
Treaties of Ireland
Treaties of Morocco
Treaties of Luxembourg
Treaties of Croatia
Treaties of Sweden
Treaties of Latvia
Treaties of Slovenia
Treaties of Norway
Treaties of Romania
Treaties of Finland
Treaties extended to British Hong Kong
Treaties of Russia
Treaties extended to Portuguese Macau
Treaties of Namibia
Treaties of Lithuania
Treaties of Ukraine
Treaties extended to the French Southern and Antarctic Lands
Treaties extended to Saint Pierre and Miquelon
Treaties extended to Wallis and Futuna
Treaties extended to New Caledonia
Treaties extended to French Polynesia
Treaties extended to French West Africa
Treaties extended to French Cameroon
Treaties extended to French Madagascar
Treaties extended to French Equatorial Africa
Treaties extended to Gibraltar
Treaties extended to the British Virgin Islands
Treaties extended to Bermuda
Treaties extended to the Cayman Islands
Treaties extended to Saint Christopher-Nevis-Anguilla
Treaties extended to Saint Helena, Ascension and Tristan da Cunha
Treaties extended to the Turks and Caicos Islands
Treaties extended to Guernsey
Treaties extended to the Falkland Islands
Treaties extended to the Isle of Man
Treaties extended to the Colony of Sarawak
Treaties extended to the Colony of North Borneo
Treaties extended to the Colony of Fiji
Treaties extended to British Guiana
Treaties extended to British Mauritius
Treaties extended to the Crown Colony of Seychelles
Treaties extended to British Antigua and Barbuda
Treaties extended to the Colony of the Bahamas
Treaties extended to British Dominica
Treaties extended to British Grenada
Treaties extended to British Saint Lucia
Treaties extended to British Saint Vincent and the Grenadines
Treaties extended to British Honduras
Treaties extended to the Gilbert and Ellice Islands
Treaties extended to the British Solomon Islands
Treaties extended to Montserrat
Treaties extended to South Georgia and the South Sandwich Islands
Treaties extended to Greenland
Treaties extended to the Faroe Islands
Treaties extended to Aruba
Treaties extended to the Netherlands Antilles
Treaties extended to French Togoland